Hanging is killing a person by suspending them from the neck with a noose or ligature. Hanging has been a common method of capital punishment since the Middle Ages, and is the primary execution method in numerous countries and regions. The first known account of execution by hanging is in Homer's Odyssey. Hanging is also a method of suicide.

The past and past participle of hang in this sense is hanged rather than hung.

Methods of judicial hanging
There are numerous methods of hanging in execution which instigate death either by cervical fracture or by strangulation.

Short drop

The short drop is a method of hanging in which the condemned prisoner stands on a raised support such as a stool, ladder, cart, or other vehicle, with the noose around the neck. The support is then moved away, leaving the person dangling from the rope.

Suspended by the neck, the weight of the body tightens the noose around the neck effecting strangulation and death. This typically takes 10–20 minutes.

Before 1850, the short drop was the standard method of hanging, and it is still common in suicides and extrajudicial hangings (such as lynchings and summary executions) which do not benefit from the specialised equipment and drop-length calculation tables used in the newer methods.

Pole method 

A short-drop variant is the Austro-Hungarian "pole" method, called  (literally: strangling gallows), in which the following steps take place:

 A rope is attached around the condemned's feet and routed through a pulley at the base of the pole.
 The condemned is hoisted to the top of the pole by means of a sling running across the chest and under the armpits.
 A narrow-diameter noose is looped around the prisoner's neck, then secured to a hook mounted at the top of the pole.
 The chest sling is released, and the prisoner is rapidly jerked downward by the assistant executioners via the foot rope.
The executioner would place the heel of his hand beneath the prisoner's jaw to increase the force on the neck vertebrae at the end of the drop, then manually dislocate the condemned's neck by forcing the head to one side while the neck vertebrae were under traction.

This method was later also adopted by the successor states, most notably by Czechoslovakia, where the "pole" method was used as the single type of execution from 1918 until the abolition of capital punishment in 1990. Nazi war criminal Karl Hermann Frank, executed in 1946 in Prague, was among approximately 1,000 condemned people executed in this manner in Czechoslovakia.

Standard drop

Its use rapidly spread to English-speaking countries and those with judicial systems of English origin.

It was considered a humane improvement on the short drop because it was intended to be enough to break the person's neck, causing immediate unconsciousness and rapid brain death.

This method was used to execute condemned Nazis under United States jurisdiction after the Nuremberg Trials including Joachim von Ribbentrop and Ernst Kaltenbrunner. In the execution of Ribbentrop, historian Giles MacDonogh records that: "The hangman botched the execution and the rope throttled the former foreign minister for 20 minutes before he expired." A Life magazine report on the execution merely says: "The trap fell open and with a sound midway between a rumble and a crash, Ribbentrop disappeared. The rope quivered for a time, then stood tautly straight."

Long drop

The long drop process, also known as the measured drop, was introduced to Britain in 1872 by William Marwood as a scientific advance on the standard drop. Instead of everyone falling the same standard distance, the person's height and weight were used to determine how much slack would be provided in the rope so that the distance dropped would be enough to ensure that the neck was broken, but not so much that the person was decapitated. Careful placement of the eye or knot of the noose (so that the head was jerked back as the rope tightened) contributed to breaking the neck.

This force resulted in some decapitations, such as the infamous case of Black Jack Ketchum in New Mexico Territory in 1901, owing to a significant weight gain while in custody not having been factored into the drop calculations. Between 1892 and 1913, the length of the drop was shortened to avoid decapitation. The decapitation of Eva Dugan during a botched hanging in 1930 led the state of Arizona to switch to the gas chamber as its primary execution method, on the grounds that it was believed more humane. One of the more recent decapitations as a result of the long drop occurred when Barzan Ibrahim al-Tikriti was hanged in Iraq in 2007. Accidental decapitation also occurred during the 1962 hanging of Arthur Lucas, one of the last two individuals to be put to death in Canada.

Nazis executed under British jurisdiction, including Josef Kramer, Fritz Klein, Irma Grese and Elisabeth Volkenrath, were hanged by Albert Pierrepoint using the variable-drop method devised by Marwood. The record speed for a British long-drop hanging was seven seconds from the executioner entering the cell to the drop. Speed was considered to be important in the British system as it reduced the condemned's mental distress.

As suicide

Hanging is a common suicide method. The materials necessary for suicide by hanging are readily available to the average person, compared with firearms or poisons. Full suspension is not required, and for this reason, hanging is especially commonplace among suicidal prisoners (see suicide watch). A type of hanging comparable to full suspension hanging may be obtained by self-strangulation using a ligature around the neck and the partial weight of the body (partial suspension) to tighten the ligature. When a suicidal hanging involves partial suspension the deceased is found to have both feet touching the ground, e.g., they are kneeling, crouching or standing. Partial suspension or partial weight-bearing on the ligature is sometimes used, particularly in prisons, mental hospitals or other institutions, where full suspension support is difficult to devise, because high ligature points (e.g., hooks or pipes) have been removed.

In Canada, hanging is the most common method of suicide, and in the U.S., hanging is the second most common method, after self-inflicted gunshot wounds. In the United Kingdom, where firearms are less easily available, in 2001 hanging was the most common method among men and the second most commonplace among women (after poisoning).

Those who survive a suicide-via-hanging attempt, whether due to breakage of the cord or ligature point, or being discovered and cut down, face a range of serious injuries, including cerebral anoxia (which can lead to permanent brain damage), laryngeal fracture, cervical spine fracture (which may cause paralysis), tracheal fracture, pharyngeal laceration, and carotid artery injury.

As human sacrifice
There are some suggestions that the Vikings practiced hanging as human sacrifices to Odin, to honour Odin's own sacrifice of hanging himself from Yggdrasil. In Northern Europe, it is widely speculated that the Iron Age bog bodies, many who show signs of having been hanged were examples of human sacrifice to the gods.

Medical effects

 
A hanging may induce one or more of the following medical conditions, some leading to death:
 Closure of carotid arteries causing cerebral hypoxia
 Closure of the jugular veins
 Breaking of the neck (cervical fracture) causing traumatic spinal cord injury or even unintended decapitation
 Closure of the airway

The cause of death in hanging depends on the conditions related to the event. When the body is released from a relatively high position, the major cause of death is severe trauma to the upper cervical spine. The injuries produced are highly variable. One study showed that only a small minority of a series of judicial hangings produced fractures to the cervical spine (6 out of 34 cases studied), with half of these fractures (3 out of 34) being the classic "hangman's fracture" (bilateral fractures of the pars interarticularis of the C2 vertebra). The location of the knot of the hanging rope is a major factor in determining the mechanics of cervical spine injury, with a submental knot (hangman's knot under the chin) being the only location capable of producing the sudden, straightforward hyperextension injury that causes the classic "hangman's fracture".

According to Historical and biomechanical aspects of hangman's fracture, the phrase in the usual execution order, "hanged by the neck until dead", was necessary. By the late 19th century that methodical study enabled authorities to routinely employ hanging in ways that would predictably kill the victim quickly.

The side, or subaural knot, has been shown to produce other, more complex injuries, with one thoroughly studied case producing only ligamentous injuries to the cervical spine and bilateral vertebral artery disruptions, but no major vertebral fractures or crush injuries to the spinal cord. Death from a "hangman's fracture" occurs mainly when the applied force is severe enough to also cause a severe subluxation of the C2 and C3 vertebra that crushes the spinal cord and/or disrupts the vertebral arteries. Hangman's fractures from other hyperextension injuries (the most common being unrestrained motor vehicle accidents and falls or diving injuries where the face or chin suddenly strike an immovable object) are frequently survivable if the applied force does not cause a severe subluxation of C2 on C3.

In the absence of fracture and dislocation, occlusion of blood vessels becomes the major cause of death, rather than asphyxiation. Obstruction of venous drainage of the brain via occlusion of the internal jugular veins leads to cerebral oedema and then cerebral ischemia. The face will typically become engorged and cyanotic (turned blue through lack of oxygen). There will be the classic sign of strangulation, petechiae, little blood marks on the face and in the eyes from burst blood capillaries. The tongue may protrude.

Compromise of the cerebral blood flow may occur by obstruction of the carotid arteries, even though their obstruction requires far more force than the obstruction of jugular veins, since they are seated deeper and they contain blood in much higher pressure compared to the jugular veins. Where death has occurred through carotid artery obstruction or cervical fracture, the face will typically be pale in colour and not show petechiae. Many reports and pictures exist of actual short-drop hangings that seem to show that the person died quickly, while others indicate a slow and agonising death by strangulation.

When cerebral circulation is severely compromised by any mechanism, arterial or venous, death occurs over four or more minutes from cerebral hypoxia, although the heart may continue to beat for some period after the brain can no longer be resuscitated. The time of death in such cases is a matter of convention. In judicial hangings, death is pronounced at cardiac arrest, which may occur at times from several minutes up to 15 minutes or longer after hanging. During suspension, once the prisoner has lapsed into unconsciousness, rippling movements of the body and limbs may occur for some time which are usually attributed to nervous and muscular reflexes. In Britain, it was normal to leave the body suspended for an hour to ensure death.

After death, the body typically shows marks of suspension: bruising and rope marks on the neck. Sphincters will relax spontaneously and urine and faeces will be evacuated. Forensic experts may often be able to tell if hanging is suicide or homicide, as each leaves a distinctive ligature mark. One of the hints they use is the hyoid bone. If broken, it often means the person has been murdered by manual strangulation.

Notable practices across the globe

Hanging has been a method of capital punishment in many countries, and is still used by many countries to this day. Long-drop hanging is mainly used by former British colonies, while short-drop and suspension hanging is common in Iran.

Afghanistan

Hanging is the most used form of capital punishment in Afghanistan.

Australia

Capital punishment was a part of the legal system of Australia from the establishment of New South Wales as a British penal colony, until 1985, by which time all Australian states and territories had abolished the death penalty; in practice, the last execution in Australia was the hanging of Ronald Ryan on 3 February 1967, in Victoria.

During the 19th century, crimes that could carry a death sentence included burglary, sheep theft, forgery, sexual assaults, murder and manslaughter. During the 19th century, there were roughly eighty people hanged every year throughout the Australian colonies for these crimes.

Bangladesh

Hanging is the only method of execution in Bangladesh, ever since its independence.

Brazil

Death by hanging was the customary method of capital punishment in Brazil throughout its history. Some important national heroes like Tiradentes (1792) were killed by hanging. The last man executed in Brazil was the slave Francisco, in 1876. The death penalty was abolished for all crimes, except for those committed under extraordinary circumstances such as war or military law, in 1890.

Bulgaria

Bulgaria's national hero, Vasil Levski, was executed by hanging by the Ottoman court in Sofia in 1873. Every year since Bulgaria's liberation, thousands come with flowers on the date of his death, 19 February, to his monument where the gallows stood. The last execution was in 1989, and the death penalty was abolished for all crimes in 1998.

Canada

Historically, hanging was the only method of execution used in Canada and was in use as possible punishment for all murders until 1961, when murders were reclassified into capital and non-capital offences. The death penalty was restricted to apply only for certain offences to the National Defence Act in 1976 and was completely abolished in 1998. The last hangings in Canada took place on 11 December 1962.

Egypt

In 1955, Egypt hanged three Israelis on charges of spying. In 1982 Egypt hanged three civilians convicted of the assassination of Anwar Sadat. In 2004, Egypt hanged five militants on charges of trying to kill the Prime Minister. To this day, hanging remains the standard method of capital punishment in Egypt, which executes more people each year than any other African country.

Germany

In the territories occupied by Nazi Germany from 1939 to 1945, strangulation hanging was a preferred means of public execution, although more criminal executions were performed by guillotine than hanging. The most commonly sentenced were partisans and black marketeers, whose bodies were usually left hanging for long periods. There are also numerous reports of concentration camp inmates being hanged. Hanging was continued in post-war Germany in the British and US Occupation Zones under their jurisdiction, and for Nazi war criminals, until well after (western) Germany itself had abolished the death penalty by the German constitution as adopted in 1949. West Berlin was not subject to the Grundgesetz (Basic Law) and abolished the death penalty in 1951. The German Democratic Republic abolished the death penalty in 1987. The last execution ordered by a West German court was carried out by guillotine in Moabit prison in 1949. The last hanging in Germany was the one ordered of several war criminals in Landsberg am Lech on 7 June 1951. The last known execution in East Germany was in 1981 by a pistol shot to the neck.

Hungary

The prime minister of Hungary, during the 1956 Revolution, Imre Nagy, was secretly tried, executed by hanging, and buried unceremoniously by the new Soviet-backed Hungarian government, in 1958. Nagy was later publicly exonerated by Hungary. Capital punishment was abolished for all crimes in 1990.

India

All executions in India since independence have been carried out by hanging, although the law provides for military executions to be carried out by firing squad. In 1949, Nathuram Godse, who had been sentenced to death for the assassination of Mahatma Gandhi, was the first person to be executed by hanging in independent India.

The Supreme Court of India has suggested that capital punishment should be given only in the "rarest of rare cases".

Since 2001, eight people have been executed in India. Dhananjoy Chatterjee, the 1991 rapist and murderer was executed on 14 August 2004 in Alipore Jail, Kolkata. Ajmal Kasab, the lone surviving terrorist of the 2008 Mumbai attacks was executed on 21 November 2012 in Yerwada Central Jail, Pune. The Supreme Court of India had previously rejected his mercy plea, which was then rejected by the President of India. He was hanged one week later. Afzal Guru, a terrorist found guilty of conspiracy in the December 2001 attack on the Indian Parliament, was executed by hanging in Tihar Jail, Delhi on 9 February 2013. Yakub Memon  was convicted over his involvement in the 1993 Bombay bombings by Special Terrorist and Disruptive Activities court on 27 July 2007. His appeals and petitions for clemency were all rejected and he was finally executed by hanging on 30 July 2015 in Nagpur jail. In March 2020, four prisoners convicted of rape and murder were executed by hanging in Tihar Jail.

Iran

Death by hanging is the primary means of capital punishment in Iran, which carries out one of the highest numbers of annual executions in the world. The method used is the short drop, which does not break the neck of the condemned, but rather causes a slower death due to strangulation. It is legal for murder, rape, and drug trafficking unless the criminal pays diyya to the victim's family, thus attaining their forgiveness (see Sharia). If the presiding judge deems the case to be "causing public outrage", he can order the hanging to take place in public at the spot where the crime was committed, typically from a mobile telescoping crane which hoists the condemned high into the air. On 19 July 2005, two boys, Mahmoud Asgari and Ayaz Marhoni, aged 15 and 17 respectively, who had been convicted of the rape of a 13-year-old boy, were hanged at Edalat (Justice) Square in Mashhad, on charges of homosexuality and rape. On 15 August 2004, a 16-year-old girl, Atefeh Sahaaleh (also called Atefeh Rajabi), was executed for having committed "acts incompatible with chastity".

At dawn on 27 July 2008, the Iranian government executed 29 people at Evin Prison in Tehran. On 2 December 2008, an unnamed man was hanged for murder at Kazeroun Prison, just moments after he was pardoned by the murder victim's family. He was quickly cut down and rushed to a hospital, where he was successfully revived.

The conviction and hanging of Reyhaneh Jabbari caused international uproar as she was sentenced to death in 2009 and hanged on 25 October 2014 for murdering a former intelligence officer; according to Jabbari's testimony she stabbed him during an attempt at rape and then another person killed him.

Iraq

Hanging was used under the regime of Saddam Hussein, but was suspended along with capital punishment on 10 June 2003, when a coalition led by the United States invaded and overthrew the previous regime. The death penalty was reinstated on 8 August 2004.

In September 2005, three murderers were the first people to be executed since the restoration. Then on 9 March 2006, an official of Iraq's Supreme Judicial Council confirmed that Iraqi authorities had executed the first insurgents by hanging.

Saddam Hussein was sentenced to death by hanging for crimes against humanity on 5 November 2006, and was executed on 30 December 2006 at approximately 6:00 a.m. local time. During the drop, there was an audible crack indicating that his neck was broken, a successful example of a long-drop hanging.

Barzan Ibrahim, the head of the Mukhabarat, Saddam's security agency, and Awad Hamed al-Bandar, former chief judge, were executed on 15 January 2007, also by the long-drop method, but Barzan was decapitated by the rope at the end of his fall.

Former vice-president Taha Yassin Ramadan had been sentenced to life in prison on 5 November 2006, but the sentence was changed to death by hanging on 12 February 2007. He was the fourth and final man to be executed for the 1982 crimes against humanity on 20 March 2007. The execution went smoothly.

At the Anfal genocide trial, Saddam's cousin Ali Hassan al-Majid (alias Chemical Ali), former defence minister Sultan Hashim Ahmed al-Tay, and former deputy Hussein Rashid Mohammed were sentenced to hang for their role in the Al-Anfal Campaign against the Kurds on 24 June 2007. Al-Majid was sentenced to death three more times: once for the 1991 suppression of a Shi'a uprising along with Abdul-Ghani Abdul Ghafur on 2 December 2008; once for the 1999 crackdown in the assassination of Grand Ayatollah Mohammad al-Sadr on 2 March 2009; and once on 17 January 2010 for the gassing of the Kurds in 1988; he was hanged on 25 January.

On 26 October 2010, Saddam's top minister Tariq Aziz was sentenced to hang for persecuting the members of rival Shi'a political parties. His sentence was commuted to indefinite imprisonment after Iraqi president Jalal Talabani did not sign his execution order and he died in prison in 2015.

On 14 July 2011, US forces transferred condemned prisoners Sultan Hashim Ahmed al-Tay and two of Saddam's half-brothers, Sabawi Ibrahim al-Tikriti and Watban Ibrahim al-Tikriti, to Iraqi authorities for execution.  The Iraqi High Tribunal had sentenced Saddam's half-brothers to death on 11 March 2009 for their roles in the executions of 42 traders who were accused of manipulating food prices.  None of the three men were executed.

It is alleged that Iraq's government keeps the execution rate secret, and hundreds may be carried out every year. In 2007, Amnesty International stated that 900 people were at "imminent risk" of execution in Iraq.

Israel

Although Israel has provisions in its criminal law to use the death penalty for extraordinary crimes, it has been used only twice, and only one of those executions was by hanging. On 31 May 1962, Nazi leader Adolf Eichmann was executed by hanging.

Japan

All executions in Japan are carried out by hanging.

On 23 December 1948, Hideki Tojo, Kenji Doihara, Akira Mutō, Iwane Matsui, Seishirō Itagaki, Kōki Hirota, and Heitaro Kimura were hanged at Sugamo Prison by the U.S. occupation authorities in Ikebukuro in Allied-occupied Japan for war crimes, crimes against humanity, and crimes against peace during the Asian-Pacific theatre of World War II.

On 27 February 2004, the mastermind of the Sarin gas attack on the Tokyo subway, Shoko Asahara, was found guilty and sentenced to death by hanging. On 25 December 2006, serial killer Hiroaki Hidaka and three others were hanged in Japan. Long-drop hanging is the method of carrying out judicial capital punishment on civilians in Japan, as in the cases of Norio Nagayama, Mamoru Takuma, and Tsutomu Miyazaki. In 2018 Shoko Asahara and several of his cult members were hanged for committing the 1995 sarin gas attack.

Jordan
Death by hanging is the traditional method of capital punishment in Jordan. On 14 August 1993, Jordan hanged two Jordanians convicted of spying for Israel. Sajida al-Rishawi, "The 4th bomber" of the 2005 Amman bombings, was executed by hanging alongside Ziad al-Karbouly on 4 February 2015  in retribution for the immolation of Jordanian pilot Muath Al-Kasasbeh.

Lebanon

Lebanon hanged two men in 1998 for murdering a man and his sister. However, capital punishment ended up being altogether suspended in Lebanon, as a result of staunch opposition by activists and some political factions.

Liberia

On 16 February 1979, seven men convicted of the ritual killing of the popular Kru traditional singer Moses Tweh, were publicly hanged at dawn in Harper.

Malaysia

Hanging is the traditional method of capital punishment in Malaysia and has been used to execute people convicted of murder and drug trafficking. The Barlow and Chambers execution was carried out as a result of new tighter drug regulations.

Portugal

The last person executed by hanging in Portugal was Francisco Matos Lobos on 16 April 1842. Before that, it had been a common death penalty.

Pakistan

In Pakistan, hanging is the most common form of execution.

Russia

Hanging was commonly practised in the Russian Empire during the rule of the Romanov Dynasty as an alternative to impalement, which was used in the 15th and 16th centuries.

Hanging was abolished in 1868 by Alexander II after serfdom, but was restored by the time of his death and his assassins were hanged. While those sentenced to death for murder were usually pardoned and sentences commuted to life imprisonment, those guilty of high treason were usually executed. This also included the Grand Duchy of Finland and Kingdom of Poland under the Russian crown. Taavetti Lukkarinen became the last Finn to be executed this way. He was hanged for espionage and high treason in 1916.

The hanging was usually performed by short drop in public. The gallows were usually either a stout nearby tree branch, as in the case of Lukkarinen, or a makeshift gallows constructed for the purpose.

After the October Revolution in 1917, capital punishment was, on paper, abolished, but continued to be used unabated against people perceived to be enemies of the regime. Under the Bolsheviks, most executions were performed by shooting, either by firing squad or by a single firearm. In 1943, hanging was restored primarily for German servicemen and native collaborators for atrocities committed against Soviet POWs and civilians. The last to be hanged were Andrey Vlasov and his companions in 1946.

Singapore

In Singapore, long-drop hanging is currently used as a mandatory punishment for crimes such as drug trafficking, murder and some types of kidnapping. It has also been used for punishing those convicted of unauthorised discharging of firearms.

Sri Lanka

Hanging was abolished in Sri Lanka in 1956, but in 1959 it was brought back and later halted in 1978. In 1975, the day before the execution of Maru Sira, he had been overdosed by the prison guards to prevent him from escaping. On the day of his execution he was unconscious, so when he was brought to the gallows, he was slumped over on the trapdoor with a noose around his neck, and when the executioner pulled the lever, his execution was botched and he strangled.

Syria

Syria has publicly hanged people, such as two Jews in 1952, Israeli spy Eli Cohen in 1965, and a number of Jews accused of spying in 1969.

According to a 19th-century report, members of the Alawite sect centred on Lattakia in Syria had a particular aversion towards being hanged, and the family of the condemned was willing to pay "considerable sums" to ensure its relations were impaled, instead of being hanged. As far as Burckhardt could make out, this attitude was based upon the Alawites' idea that the soul ought to leave the body through the mouth, rather than leave it in any other fashion.

United Kingdom

As a form of judicial execution in England, hanging is thought to date from the Anglo-Saxon period. Records of the names of British hangmen begin with Thomas de Warblynton in the 1360s; complete records extend from the 16th century to the last hangmen, Robert Leslie Stewart and Harry Allen, who conducted the last British executions in 1964.

Until 1868 hangings were performed in public. In London, the traditional site was at Tyburn, a settlement west of the City on the main road to Oxford, which was used on eight hanging days a year, though before 1865, executions had been transferred to the street outside Newgate Prison, Old Bailey, now the site of the Central Criminal Court.

Three British subjects were hanged after World War II after having been convicted of having helped Nazi Germany in its war against Britain. John Amery, the son of prominent British politician Leo Amery, became an expatriate in the 1930s, moving to France. He became involved in pre-war fascist politics, remained in what became Vichy France following France's defeat by Germany in 1940 and eventually went to Germany and later the German puppet state in Italy headed by Benito Mussolini. Captured by Italian partisans at the end of the war and handed over to British authorities, Amery was accused of having made propaganda broadcasts for the Nazis and of having attempted to recruit British prisoners of war for a Waffen SS regiment later known as the British Free Corps. Amery pleaded guilty to treason charges on 28 November 1945 and was hanged at Wandsworth Prison on 19 December 1945. William Joyce, an American-born Irishman who had lived in Britain and possessed a British passport, had been involved in pre-war fascist politics in the UK, fled to Nazi Germany just before the war began to avoid arrest by British authorities and became a naturalised German citizen. He made propaganda broadcasts for the Nazis, becoming infamous under the nickname Lord Haw Haw. Captured by British forces in May 1945, he was tried for treason later that year. Although Joyce's defence argued that he was by birth American and thus not subject to being tried for treason, the prosecution successfully argued that Joyce's pre-war British passport meant that he was a subject of the British Crown and he was convicted. After his appeals failed, he was hanged at Wandsworth Prison on 3 January 1946. Theodore Schurch, a British soldier captured by the Nazis who then began working for the Italian and German intelligence services by acting as a spy and informer who would be placed among other British prisoners, was arrested in Rome in March 1945 and tried under the Treachery Act 1940. After his conviction, he was hanged at HM Prison Pentonville on 4 January 1946.

The Homicide Act 1957 created the new offence of capital murder, punishable by death, with all other murders being punishable by life imprisonment.

In 1965, Parliament passed the Murder (Abolition of Death Penalty) Act, temporarily abolishing capital punishment for murder for five years. The Act was renewed in 1969, making the abolition permanent. With the passage of the Crime and Disorder Act 1998 and the Human Rights Act 1998, the death penalty was officially abolished for all crimes in both civilian and military cases. Following its complete abolition, the gallows were removed from Wandsworth Prison, where they remained in full working order until that year.

The last woman to be hanged was Ruth Ellis on 13 July 1955, by Albert Pierrepoint who was a prominent hangman in the 20th century in England. The last hangings in Britain took place in 1964, when Peter Anthony Allen was executed at Walton Prison in Liverpool. Gwynne Owen Evans was executed by Harry Allen at Strangeways Prison in Manchester. Both were executed for the murder of John Alan West.

Hanging was also the method used in many colonies and overseas territories.

Silken rope
In the UK, some felons were traditionally executed by hanging with a silken rope:
 Hereditary peers who committed capital offences, as anticipated by the fictional Duke of Denver, brother of Lord Peter Wimsey. The Duke was accused of murder in the novel Clouds of Witness, and this execution would have been his fate, after conviction by his peers in a trial in the House of Lords. It has been claimed that the execution of Earl Ferrers in 1760 – the only time a peer was hanged after trial by the House of Lords – was carried out with the normal hempen rope instead of a silk one. The writ of execution does not specify a silk rope be used, and The Newgate Calendar makes no mention of the use of such an item – an unusual omission given its highly sensationalist nature.
 Those who have the Freedom of the City of London.

United States

Hanging was one means by which Puritans of the Massachusetts Bay Colony enforced religious and intellectual conformity on the whole community. The best known hanging carried out by the Puritans, Mary Dyer was one of the four executed Quakers known as the Boston martyrs.

Capital punishment in the U.S. varies from state to state; it is outlawed in some states but used in most others. However, the death penalty under federal law is applicable in every state. Hanging is no longer used as a method of execution.

When Black pastor Denmark Vesey of the Emanuel African Methodist Episcopal Church was suspected of plotting to launch a slave rebellion in Charleston, South Carolina in 1822, 35 people, including Vesey, were judged guilty by a city-appointed court and were subsequently hanged, and the church was burned down.

The largest mass execution in the United States, of 38 Sioux Indians sentenced to death after being charged for engaging in massacres of white settlers, was carried out by hanging in Mankato, Minnesota in 1862. Originally, 303 had been sentenced to hang, but the convictions were reviewed by President Abraham Lincoln and the sentences of all but 38 were commuted. A total of 40 suspected Unionists were hanged in Gainesville, Texas in October 1862. On 7 July 1865, four people involved in the assassination of President Abraham Lincoln—Mary Surratt, Lewis Powell, David Herold, and George Atzerodt—were hanged at Fort McNair in Washington, D.C.

While relatively uncommon, hanging in chains has also been practiced (mainly during the colonial era), the first being a slave after the New York Slave Revolt of 1712. The last hanging in chains was in 1913, of John Marshall in West Virginia for murder. The last public hanging in the United States (not including lynching, one of the last of which was Michael Donald in 1981) took place on 14 August 1936, in Owensboro, Kentucky. Rainey Bethea was executed for the rape and murder of 70-year-old Lischa Edwards. The execution was presided over by the first female sheriff in Kentucky, Florence Shoemaker Thompson.

In California, Clinton Duffy, who served as warden of San Quentin State Prison between 1940 and 1952, presided over ninety executions. He began to oppose the death penalty, and after his retirement, wrote a memoir entitled Eighty-Eight Men and Two Women in support of the movement to abolish the death penalty. The book documents several hangings gone wrong and describes how they led his predecessor, Warden James B. Holohan, to persuade the California Legislature to replace hanging with the gas chamber in 1937.

Various methods of capital punishment have been replaced by lethal injection in most states and the federal government. Many states that offered hanging as an option have since eliminated the method. Condemned murderer Victor Feguer became the last inmate to be executed by hanging in the state of Iowa on 15 March 1963. Hanging was the preferred method of execution for capital murder cases in Iowa until 1965, when the death penalty was abolished and replaced with life imprisonment without parole. Barton Kay Kirkham was the last person to be hanged in Utah, preferring it over execution by firing squad. No subsequent inmate in Utah had been hanged by the time the option was replaced with lethal injection in 1980. Laws in Delaware were changed in 1986 to specify lethal injection, except for those convicted before 1986 (who were still allowed to choose hanging). If a choice was not made, or the convict refused to choose injection, then hanging would become the default method. This was the case in the 1996 execution of Billy Bailey, the most recent hanging in American history; since then, no Delaware prisoner fit the category, and the state's gallows were later dismantled.

Upright Jerker

The "Upright Jerker" is a method of hanging, that originated from the United States in the late 19th century, where the person to be hanged is jerked into the air by weights and pulleys. It proved to be ineffective at breaking the neck of the condemned and use of the method ceased in late  1930s.

Inverted hanging, the "Jewish" punishment

A completely different principle of hanging is to hang the convicted person from their legs, rather than from their neck, either as a form of torture, or as an execution method. The jurist Ulrich Tengler, in his highly influential  from 1509, describes the procedure as follows, in the section :

 showed that originally, this type of inverted hanging between two dogs was not a punishment specifically for Jews. Esther Cohen writes:

In Spain 1449, during a mob attack against the Marranos (Jews nominally converted to Christianity), the Jews resisted, but lost and several of them were hanged up by the feet. The first attested German case for a Jew being hanged by the feet is from 1296, in present-day Soultzmatt. Some other historical examples of this type of hanging within the German context are one Jew in Hennegau 1326, two Jews hanged in Frankfurt 1444, one in Halle in 1462, one in Dortmund 1486, one in Hanau 1499, one in Breslau 1505, one in Württemberg 1553, one in Bergen 1588, one in Öttingen 1611, one in Frankfurt 1615 and again in 1661, and one condemned to this punishment in Prussia in 1637.

The details of the cases vary widely: In the 1444 Frankfurt cases and the 1499 Hanau case, the dogs were dead prior to being hanged, and in the late 1615 and 1661 cases in Frankfurt, the Jews (and dogs) were merely kept in this torture for half an hour, before being garroted from below. In the 1588 Bergen case, all three victims were left hanging till they were dead, ranging from 6 to 8 days after being hanged. In the Dortmund 1486 case, the dogs bit the Jew to death while hanging. He was strung up between two dogs, and a large fire was made close to him, and he expired after half an hour under this torture. In the 1553 Württemberg case, the Jew chose to convert to Christianity after hanging like this for 24 hours; he was then given the mercy to be hanged in the ordinary manner, from the neck, and without the dogs beside him. In the 1462 Halle case, the Jew Abraham also converted after 24 hours hanging upside down, and a priest went up on a ladder and baptised him. For two more days, Abraham was left hanging, while the priest argued with the city council that a true Christian should not be punished in this way. On the third day, Abraham was granted a reprieve, and was taken down, but died 20 days later in the local hospital having meanwhile suffered in extreme pain. In the 1637 case, where the Jew had murdered a Christian jeweller, the appeal to the empress was successful, and out of mercy, the Jew was condemned to be merely pinched with glowing pincers, have hot lead dripped into his wounds, and then be broken alive on the wheel.

Some of the reported cases may be myths, or wandering stories. The 1326 Hennegau case, for example, deviates from the others in that the Jew was not a thief, but was suspected (even though he was a convert to Christianity) of having struck an al fresco painting of Virgin Mary, so that blood had begun to seep down the wall from the painting. Even under all degrees of judicial torture, the Jew denied performing this sacrilegious act, and was therefore exonerated. Then a brawny smith demanded from him a trial by combat, because, supposedly, in a dream the Virgin herself had besought the smith to do so. The court accepted the smith's challenge, he easily won the combat against the Jew, who was duly hanged up by the feet between two dogs. To add to the injury, one let him be slowly roasted as well as hanged. This is a very similar story to one told in France, in which a young Jew threw a lance at the head of a statue of the Virgin, so that blood spurted out of it. There was inadequate evidence for a normal trial, but a frail old man asked for trial by combat, and bested the young Jew. The Jew confessed his crime, and was hanged by his feet between two mastiffs.

The features of the earliest attested case, that of a Jewish thief hanged by the feet in Soultzmatt in 1296 are also rather divergent from the rest. The Jew managed somehow, after he had been left to die, to twitch his body in such a manner that he could hoist himself up on the gallows and free himself. At that time, his feet were so damaged that he was unable to escape, and when he was discovered 8 days after he had been hanged, he was strangled to death by the townspeople.

As late as in 1699 Celle, the courts were sufficiently horrified at how the Jewish leader of a robber gang (condemned to be hanged in the normal manner) declared blasphemies against Christianity, that they made a ruling on the post mortem treatment of Jonas Meyer. After 3 days, his corpse was cut down, his tongue cut out, and his body was hanged up again, but this time from its feet.

Punishment for traitors
Guido Kisch writes that the first instance he knows where a person in Germany was hanged up by his feet between two dogs until he died occurred about 1048, some 250 years earlier than the first attested Jewish case. This was a knight called Arnold, who had murdered his lord; the story is contained in Adam of Bremen's History of the Archbishops of Hamburg-Bremen. Another example of a non-Jew who suffered this punishment as a torture, in 1196 Richard, Count of Acerra, was one of those executed by Henry VI in the suppression of the rebelling Sicilians:

A couple of centuries earlier, in France 991, a viscount Walter nominally owing his allegiance to the French King Hugh Capet chose, on instigation of his wife, to join the rebellion under Odo I, Count of Blois. When Odo found out he had to abandon Melun after all, Walter was duly hanged before the gates, whereas his wife, the fomentor of treason, was hanged by her feet, causing much merriment and jeers from Hugh's soldiers as her clothes fell downwards revealing her naked body, although it is not wholly clear if she died in that manner.

Elizabethan maritime law
During Queen Elizabeth I's reign, the following was written concerning those who stole a ship from the Royal Navy:

Hanging by the ribs

In 1713, Juraj Jánošík, a semi-legendary Slovak outlaw and folk hero, was sentenced to be hanged from his left rib. He was left to slowly die.

The German physician Gottlob Schober (1670–1739), who worked in Russia from 1712, notes that a person could hang from the ribs for about three days prior to expiring, his primary pain being that of extreme thirst. He thought this degree of insensitivity was something peculiar to the Russian mentality.

The Dutch in Suriname were also in the habit of hanging a slave from the ribs, a custom amongst the African tribes from whom they were originally purchased. John Gabriel Stedman stayed in South America from 1772 to 1777 and described the method as told by a witness:

William Blake was specially commissioned to make illustrations to Stedman's narrative.

Grammar
The standard past tense and past participle form of the verb "hang", in this sense, is "hanged", although some dictionaries give "hung" as an alternative.

See also 

 Capital punishment
 Death erection
 Dule tree
 Erotic asphyxiation
 Executioner
 Gallows
 Hand of Glory
 Hanging judge
 Hanging tree (United States)
 Hangman (game)
 Hangman's knot
 Jack Ketch
 List of people who died by hanging
 List of suicides
 Lynching
 Lynching in the United States
 Suicide by hanging

References

Further reading
 Jack Shuler, The Thirteenth Turn: A History of the Noose. New York: Public Affairs, 2014,

External links

A Case Of Strangulation Fabricated As Hanging
Obliquity vs. Discontinuity of ligature mark in diagnosis of hanging – a comparative study
Death Penalty Worldwide  Academic research database on the laws, practice, and statistics of capital punishment for every death penalty country in the world.

 
Execution methods
Human positions